The first cabinet of Gheorghe Grigore Cantacuzino was the government of Romania from 11 April 1899 to 6 July 1900.

Ministers
The ministers of the cabinet were as follows:

President of the Council of Ministers:
Gheorghe Grigore Cantacuzino (11 April 1899 - 6 July 1900)
Minister of the Interior: 
Gheorghe Grigore Cantacuzino (11 April 1899 - 9 January 1900)
Gen. George Manu (9 January - 6 July 1900)
Minister of Foreign Affairs: 
Ion Lahovari (11 April 1899 - 6 July 1900)
Minister of Finance:
Gen. George Manu (11 April 1899 - 9 January 1900)
Take Ionescu (9 January - 6 July 1900)
Minister of Justice:
Constantin G. Dissescu (11 April 1899 - 6 July 1900)
Minister of War:
Gen. Iacob Lahovari (11 April 1899 - 6 July 1900)
Minister of Religious Affairs and Public Instruction:
Take Ionescu (11 April 1899 - 9 January 1900)
Constantin Istrati (9 January - 6 July 1900)
Minister of Agriculture, Industry, Commerce, and Property:
Nicolae Fleva (11 April 1899 - 6 July 1900)
Minister of Public Works:
Constantin Istrati (11 April 1899 - 9 January 1900)
Ion C. Grădișteanu (9 January - 6 July 1900)

References

Cabinets of Romania
Cabinets established in 1899
Cabinets disestablished in 1900
1899 establishments in Romania
1900 disestablishments in Romania